Dowlatabad (also Romanized as Dowlatābād) is a village in Dowlatabad Rural District of the Central District of Namin County, Ardabil province, Iran. At the 2006 census, its population was 1,484 in 330 households. The following census in 2011 counted 1,624 people in 424 households. The latest census in 2016 showed a population of 1,587 people in 442 households; it was the largest village in its rural district.

References 

Namin County

Towns and villages in Namin County

Populated places in Ardabil Province

Populated places in Namin County